Spirit Airlines, Inc. (stylized as spirit), is a major United States ultra-low cost airline headquartered in Miramar, Florida, in the Miami metropolitan area. Spirit operates scheduled flights throughout the United States, the Caribbean and Latin America. Spirit was the eighth largest passenger carrier in North America  as well as the largest ultra-low-cost carrier in North America.

, the deal was approved by a majority of the airline's voting shareholders. The offer awaits approval by government regulators.

History

Establishment 1964–2007 
The company started as Clippert Trucking Company in 1964. In 1974, the company changed its name to Ground Air Transfer, Inc. In 1983, the airline service was founded in Macomb County, Michigan, by Ned Homfeld as Charter One Airlines, a Detroit-based charter tour operator providing travel packages to entertainment destinations such as Atlantic City, Las Vegas, and the Bahamas.

1990s 
In 1990, Charter One began scheduled service from Boston and Providence, Rhode Island, to Atlantic City. In May 1992, Charter One brought jet aircraft into the fleet and changed its name to Spirit Airlines. Scheduled flights between Detroit and Atlantic City began on June 1, 1992. Scheduled flights between Boston and Providence began on June 15, 1992.

In April 1993, Spirit Airlines began scheduled service to Orlando, Fort Lauderdale, and St. Petersburg, Florida. Flights between Atlantic City and Fort Myers, Florida, began in September 1993. Service at Philadelphia began in 1994. During the next five years, Spirit expanded further, increasing service from Detroit and adding service in new markets such as Myrtle Beach, Los Angeles, and New York City.

In the summer of 1994, Spirit Airlines overbooked flights, and 1,400 customers' tickets were canceled. The overbooking occurred because Spirit Airlines had given incorrect instructions to travel agents, causing those tickets not to be valid, even though the customers had paid for the flights. In response to criticism, Spirit Airlines said it would make sure all paid customers would always be able to fly to their destination, even if Spirit Airlines had to book them on a competitor's airline.

In 1996, Janet Patton became Spirit Airlines' first woman pilot. In 1998, she became the first woman captain. At the time Spirit was utilizing DC-9 and MD-80 aircraft.

Spirit initially had their headquarters in Eastpointe, Michigan, formerly East Detroit, in Metro Detroit. It relocated its headquarters in November 1999, moving to Miramar, Florida, in the Miami metropolitan area. Prior to the decision to move the headquarters to Miramar, Spirit considered Atlantic City, New Jersey, and Detroit, Michigan.

2000s 
In 2000, the US Federal Aviation Administration (FAA) fined Spirit Airlines $67,000 for violating federal regulations on cabin and seat markings and placards. Discrepancies were found in the marking and placarding of emergency equipment, passenger seats, storage areas and doors on eight of Spirit's DC9 and MD80 aircraft.

In November 2001, Spirit inaugurated service to San Juan, Puerto Rico. They implemented a fully integrated Spanish-language customer service plan including a website and dedicated reservation line.

In the fall of 2003, Spirit resumed flights to Washington, D.C.'s Ronald Reagan Washington National Airport, which were suspended after the September 11 attacks. Spirit began service to Grand Cayman, San Francisco, and Boston in 2006. In 2007, Spirit filed DOT applications to offer service to Costa Rica, Haiti, the Netherlands Antilles and Venezuela.

In January 2005, Ben Baldanza was hired as the President of Spirit, with the goal of making the company profitable. In 2006, following an investment by Indigo Partners, Baldanza was elevated to the CEO role and held the position for 10 years. This included a complete transformation of the business model and a public offering in 2011. 

In 2006, Spirit exercised options to order 30 Airbus A320-200 aircraft for further expansion. Deliveries began in March 2010.

In June 2008, Spirit Airlines made a WARN (Worker Adjustment and Retraining Notice) application to potentially relocate or lay off hundreds of pilots and flight attendants, and the closure of their San Juan and LaGuardia crew bases. In September 2008, Spirit began placing advertisements on the side of aircraft, overhead bins, tray tables, seatback inserts and bulkheads.

In May 2009, after more than four years of inconclusive negotiations between the airline and the Air Line Pilots Association (ALPA), Spirit pilots overwhelmingly (98% of votes) voted in favor of strike action over compensation, work rules, and benefits. At that time, Spirit pilots were among the lowest-paid Airbus pilots in the United States. On June 12, 2010, Spirit grounded its flights when its unionized pilots walked out on strike, stranding thousands of passengers. This was the first passenger airline strike by American ALPA-represented pilots since Comair in 2001. 

On June 15, negotiations between the airline and ALPA resumed. A tentative agreement was reached late in the evening on June 16. The tentative agreement, which Spirit pilots later , brought Spirit pilots' compensation and benefits in line with comparable Airbus operators in the US. Flights resumed on June 18.

In 2007, Spirit Plus was rebranded as "Big Front Seat" and business class service was discontinued. For an additional fee, a person could choose "Big Front Seat", or upgrade at the airport. In December 2010, Spirit Airlines introduced the Free Spirit World MasterCard.

2010s 
In April 2010, Spirit Airlines became the first U.S. airline to charge passengers for carry-on bags. They were later followed by Allegiant Air and Frontier Airlines.

In April 2012, citing the airline's strict refund policy, Spirit Airlines representative Misty Pinson announced that the airline would not issue a refund to dying veteran Jerry Meekins, who had purchased a non-refundable ticket between Florida and Atlantic City. The 76-year-old Vietnam veteran and Marine tried to get his $197 back after learning his esophageal cancer was terminal and being told by his doctor not to fly. The decision caused outrage among veterans' groups and the general public, some of whom threatened to boycott Spirit unless both a refund and apology were issued. In May, Spirit CEO Ben Baldanza apologized for how the situation was handled and personally refunded Meekins' ticket. The airline made a $5,000 donation to the Wounded Warrior Project in Meekins' name.

In August 2013, Spirit reached an agreement on a new five-year deal with the Transport Workers Union of America, who represent the airline's flight dispatchers.

In November 2014, Morgan Stanley named Spirit the top growth airline pick for investors.

In January 2016, former AirTran CEO Robert L. Fornaro replaced Baldanza as CEO. This prompted rumors of a merger with Frontier Airlines, which would have created the largest ultra-low-cost carrier in the Americas. Fornaro announced the airline would be teaming up with the Disney Institute to “create a common purpose and a fresh set of service standards”, and changing policies internally to create a more welcoming environment.

In November 2017, Spirit's on-time performance was second in the country, behind only Delta Air Lines, a significant improvement from December 2015, when it ranked last among thirteen airlines with 68.7% of flights arriving on time. In February 2018, Spirit was the only airline in North America to make the list of the top 10 safest in the world.

In May 2018, Spirit announced that they would be the first ultra-low-cost carrier to fit their aircraft with high-speed WiFi access that started in the fall of 2018. All of their aircraft were expected to be equipped with WiFi by summer 2019.

In December 2019, Spirit Airlines announced its intention to purchase 100 new Airbus A320neo family aircraft.

2020s 
In 2020, due to the COVID-19 pandemic, Spirit Airlines received $334 million in aid in the form of grants and loans via the Coronavirus Aid, Relief and Economic Security Act (CARES). The money was used to fund employees until September 30. In July 2020, the company announced that it would put 20–30% of its employees on leave of absence in October. In August, some pilots and flight attendants agreed to take a voluntary leave of absence or have their work schedule temporarily reduced to avoid layoffs.

In July 2020, a passenger died of COVID-19 on a Spirit Airlines flight. Spirit Airlines claimed it notified the Centers for Disease Control but there was no record of the contact. Passengers on the flight were not informed that they were around an infected individual.

In February 2022, Spirit announced its intention to be acquired by Frontier Airlines pending regulatory approval, with Frontier Airlines stock being the surviving entity. The deal would make the combined airline the fifth largest airline in the U.S. In July 2022, Spirit's shareholders rejected Frontier's offer.

In April 2022, JetBlue proposed to acquire Spirit for $33 per share in cash, equivalent to $3.6 billion. In May, Spirit said its board of directors has decided not to consider JetBlue's proposal. According to Spirit Airlines, JetBlue's proposed acquisition would be unlikely to be approved by the U.S. Department of Justice's Antitrust Division, because it would likely believe that an ultra-low-cost carrier being purchased by a higher-fare airline would increase fares for consumers. Spirit noted that the Antitrust Division is looking into JetBlue's strategic partnership with American Airlines for the same reason.

In July 2022, JetBlue reached an agreement to purchase Spirit for $33.50 per share, with additional inducements for Spirit shareholders. If the deal goes through, the unified company will become the fifth-largest airline based in the United States. In January 2023, the Department of Justice began collecting depositions to prepare for a lawsuit to block the acquisition.

Corporate affairs

Ownership 
Spirit Airlines, Inc., is a Delaware corporation that is publicly traded on the New York Stock Exchange.

Business trends 
The key trends for Spirit Airlines are (years ending December 31):

Headquarters 
Spirit has its headquarters at 2800 Executive Way, Miramar, Florida. It moved there from its previous Eastpointe location in 1999.  there were 600 employees located in the office. Chris Sloan of Airways Magazine stated that the building was "nondescript low slung". Sloan added that the interior, prior to a 2014 renovation, was, "To put it charitably, [...] a dump", but that employees felt ownership over the office.

The airline anticipates that it will house 1,000 employees.

Business model 
Under CEO Ben Baldanza, Spirit began a transition to an ultra-low-cost carrier, following a fare model involving charging for amenities that are often included in the base ticket price of traditional carriers. Passengers who wanted to customize their itinerary or seat selection paid an add-on fee for each additional feature, which enabled the carrier to earn ancillary revenue in excess of 40% of total revenue. These included having an agent print a boarding pass at check-in versus doing it online or at a kiosk, for any large carry-on or checked bags, progressive fees for overweight bags, selected seat assignments, travel insurance, and more.

Controversy 
Spirit Airlines has been the subject of complaints, and to punitive actions by the United States Department of Transportation (DOT). Most of the claims against the company were for allegations of deceptive advertising practices, customer service, and the airline's policies for charging additional fees at the time of purchase:
In November 2011, the DOT fined Spirit $43,900 for alleged deceptive advertising practices. The complaint claimed that the airline had been running an advertising campaign which promoted specific discounted fares on billboards, posters, and Twitter, but did not disclose full details regarding extra fees added onto the advertised rates.
In January 2012, the DOT fined Spirit $100,000 for mishandling of complaints related to its treatment of customers with disabilities.
In 2013, and 2015, the DOT received more passenger complaints about Spirit than any other airline. The rate of complaints was "dramatically higher" than the overall rate for the industry.
On August 3, 2021, Spirit Airlines cancelled 40% of its flights, leaving travelers stranded because it had no arrangements with other airlines to book its passengers on other airlines' flights. Spirit Airlines said, "We're working around the clock to get back on track in the wake of some travel disruptions over the weekend due to a series of weather and operational challenges. We needed to make proactive cancellations to some flights across the network, but the majority of flights are still scheduled as planned." By August 10, the schedule was stabilizing.

Destinations 

Spirit currently flies to 83 destinations throughout Central America, the Caribbean, South America, and the United States. , It maintains crew bases at Atlanta, Atlantic City, Chicago–O'Hare, Dallas/Fort Worth, Detroit, Fort Lauderdale, Houston–Intercontinental, Las Vegas, Miami, and Orlando.

Fleet

Current fleet 
, Spirit Airlines operates an all-A320 and all-A320neo family fleet. A February 2020 fleet plan outlines 293 aircraft planned by 2027. An order of 100 additional aircraft with 50 options was announced in October 2019.

Historical fleet 
The following aircraft formerly operated in the Spirit Airlines fleet:

Services

Frequent-flyer program 
Spirit Airlines Frequent-flyer program is called Free Spirit, entitled as such due to the state of persons who travel using Spirit Airlines.  Spirit has a three-tier frequent flyer status program. The tiers are Free Spirit Member, Silver (Earn 2,000 status qualifying points in a calendar year), and Gold (Earn 5,000 status qualifying points in a calendar year).

Incidents and accidents 

 On November 22, 2013, A Spirit Airlines flight landed at Hartsfield-Jackson Atlanta International Airport when a man claimed he had a bomb onboard the plane.

 On July 10, 2022, Spirit Airlines Flight 383, an Airbus A320-232, suffered fire and smoke on its left main landing gear wheels during the landing sequence to Runway 28 at Hartsfield-Jackson Atlanta International Airport, Georgia. No injuries were reported and the plane was towed to the gate where passengers safely disembarked. The plane was taken out of service for inspection and maintenance.

See also 
 Air transportation in the United States
 JetBlue

References

External links 

 
 

1980 establishments in Michigan
2011 initial public offerings
Airlines based in Florida
Airlines established in 1980
Companies based in Broward County, Florida
Companies listed on the New York Stock Exchange
Low-cost carriers
Miramar, Florida
Oaktree Capital Management
Announced mergers and acquisitions